A Royal Naval Armament Depot (RNAD) is an armament depot (or a group of depots) dedicated to supplying the Royal Navy (as well as, at various times, the Royal Air Force, the British Army and foreign and Commonwealth forces). They were sister depots of Royal Naval Cordite Factories, Royal Naval Torpedo and Royal Naval Mine Depots. The only current RNAD is RNAD Coulport, which is the UK Strategic Weapon Facility for the nuclear-armed Trident Missile System; with many others being retained as tri-service 'Defence Munitions' sites.

Historically, several of these depots played a key role in Britain's military history. In the early modern period, Britain's national defences were developed along different lines to those that emerged on the continent of Europe. Rather than focusing on having a large army and heavily fortified cities, England (and then Great Britain) built up its navy. In this period, Britain's principal ordnance stores were planned with ease of access for the Navy in mind. Whereas, on the continent, guns and gunpowder were kept in fortified strongholds where they were accessible to the field armies and garrisons based there, in Britain they were stored as close as possible to the Royal Navy Dockyards, to facilitate the transfer of armaments between the depots and warships, but not too close to minimise the risk of any accident or explosion in the depot causing damage to warships.

History

Under the Board of Ordnance 

The earliest Ordnance Depots, several of which later became RNADs, were built by the Board of Ordnance (an autonomous office of the state, based at the Tower of London). The Board of Ordnance was responsible for all forts and armaments within the United Kingdom as well as the British Empire; it provided ordnance and ammunition for both naval and military uses.

In the Tudor period, the Board maintained 'gun wharves' close to each Royal Navy Dockyard and Anchorage where cannons, shot, small arms and other items were kept available ready for naval use. Gunpowder was stored separately (initially in nearby fortified structures such as Portsmouth's Square Tower, Plymouth's Royal Citadel and Upnor Castle on the River Medway). After 1671 the gun wharf at Woolwich Dockyard was extended to the east and by 1700 ammunition was being assembled on the site, which soon expanded to become the Board's principal manufacturing facility (later named the Royal Arsenal).

In the 1720s the Board of Ordnance consolidated its gunwharf activity within new, purpose-built sites at Chatham, Portsmouth and Devonport). Some years later, the Board began to design and build gunpowder magazine depots (nearby, but at a more-or-less safe distance): at Priddy's Hard near Gosport (from 1771) and at Keyham Point near Devonport (from 1775). The Thames dockyards were served by the Board's central magazine complex at Purfleet, as were the yards on the Medway (where Upnor Castle continued to serve as an interim store).

In times of conflict the demand for provision (and therefore storage) of gunpowder grew, so additional magazines were built during the French Revolutionary Wars at Tipner (from 1788) and Weedon (from 1802), and during the Napoleonic Wars at Upnor (from 1806) and Marchwood (from 1811). During the Crimean War a new magazine depot was begun in 1851 at Bull Point near Plymouth (replacing Keyham, where the site was required for Dockyard expansion); and at the same time new magazines were built at Tipner, Weedon, Upnor and Marchwood, more than doubling capacity in most cases. In addition to these (and a number of temporary magazines established when and where they were needed) significant use was made of obsolete warships to serve as floating magazines; (this strategy continued through to the Second World War, when Implacable and Foudroyant were thus employed).

Under the War Office 
When the Board of Ordnance was abolished in 1855 control of its assets passed to the War Office; they were overseen by a series of different military authorities:
 The Military Store Department (1857–1869)
 The Control Department (1870–1875)
 The Ordnance Store Department (1875–1891).

This period coincided with a revolution in naval ordnance, with new gun and shell technology being developed for a new generation of ironclad warships. An emphasis was placed on adapting the established depots to handling the new ammunition, rather than on establishing new depot sites (although much needed additional storage space was provided in 1875 when a new magazine complex was opened at Chattenden near Upnor).

Some depots began to develop a manufacturing role alongside that of storage: a factory opened on Portsmouth Gunwharf in 1863 for making gun carriages; together with the 'Royal Laboratory' across the harbour on Priddy's Hard, it was designated and managed as a Royal Ordnance Factory. Over the next two decades, the aforementioned Laboratory (established some years earlier for cartridge and small-arms ammunition manufacture) developed into a facility for shell-filling, an activity which soon outgrew its initial accommodation and spread into new purpose-built complexes at this and most of the other magazine depots.

Under the Admiralty

Naval Ordnance Store Department (1891–1918) 

In 1891, the decision was taken to divide responsibility for armament provision (for the army and the navy respectively) between the War Office and the Admiralty, with assets (including premises, personnel, equipment and supply vessels) being divided between the two services. For their part, the Admiralty established a new Naval Ordnance Store Department, based at the Royal Arsenal, Woolwich and overseen by the Director of Naval Ordnance, to manage them.

As part of this process, the gunwharves at Portsmouth and Chatham were each divided in two between the Navy and the Army, as were storage facilities at Woolwich Arsenal; at Plymouth the Devonport gun wharf remained with the Army, so a new naval gunwharf was set up within part of the Royal William Victualling Yard. Other ordnance locations (including some which were initially divided) ended up either with one service or the other; those that remained with the Army included Purfleet, Tipner and Weedon ordnance depots.

A memorandum of 18 January 1892 stated that:

By the start of the 20th century, however, all these facilities were officially known as Royal Naval Ordnance Depôts (as were the smaller depots belonging to the Admiralty, both at home and overseas).

It was only in the last decade of the nineteenth century that gunpowder began to lose its primacy in ordnance manufacture. Cordite was patented in 1889 and soon found widespread use as a smokeless propellant; and from 1896 lyddite began to replace gunpowder in explosive shells. Guncotton (patented in 1846 but little used subsequently due to hazards inherent in its manufacture) eventually came to be used in naval mines and torpedoes. By the end of the century the ordnance depots were being expanded and adapted to provide specialist storage magazines for these explosives, alongside substantial separate storehouses for shells and mines. (Torpedoes, and later mines, were stored in their own separate depots.) The storage requirements of cordite and dry guncotton in particular led to the characteristic layout of depots in the twentieth century: as series of small, individually traversed, lightly roofed, single-storey buildings interlinked by narrow-gauge railways.

Several new Depots were established during, or in the run up to, the First World War, including a number in Scotland, where new naval dockyards had opened at Rosyth and Invergordon.

Armament Supply Department (1918–1964)

On 23 December 1918 the Naval Ordnance Store Department was renamed the Armament Supply Department and its depots were likewise renamed Royal Naval Armament Depots (RNAD) in 1920. The change of nomenclature recognised the inclusion of torpedoes and naval mines (which had been managed separately during the war) alongside ordnance as part of the new department's responsibilities.

The vulnerability of the armament depots to air strikes was now acknowledged, so the Admiralty explored the feasibility of building magazines underground, initially at Ernesettle (just north of Bull Point, Plymouth) where four such magazines were built and at the recently established RNAD Crombie (near HM Dockyard, Rosyth) where six were built. Despite the cost, and sustained resistance from HM Treasury, plans were then laid down for the development of several far larger subterranean depots, with sixty magazines proposed at Dean Hill (near Salisbury) and ninety at Trecŵn (near Fishguard). Approval for these was only given in 1938–39, when war seemed all but inevitable, and they took several years to build; in the meantime a temporary depot was established (and later made permanent) on the site of a former colliery at Broughton Moor in West Cumberland. Once war was declared, however, the development of similar underground complexes was abandoned in favour of faster solutions, with railway tunnels, warehouses and other improvised locations made use of. Thus, whereas in early 1939 only five home RNADs were listed in the Navy List (viz. Woolwich, Portsmouth, Plymouth, Chatham and Crombie), by 1945 over thirty are mentioned, in addition to these five, with nine more RNADs in various locations listed as sub-depots of the 'Central Naval Armament Supply Depots, Wolverhampton'. Similarly overseas, the 1939 list of seven RNADs (Gibraltar, Malta, Hong Kong, Singapore, Simon's Town, Bermuda and Ceylon) had grown to a list of over twenty (with several more sub-depots in addition).

The Armament Supply Department continued in operation until 1965.

Under the Ministry of Defence 
On 1 January 1965 control of the naval armament depots passed to the Ministry of Defence and they became part of the Royal Naval Supply and Transport Service (RNSTS). The RNSTS was formed from an amalgamation of the Directorates of Naval Stores, Victualling, Armament Supply, and Movements.

On 1 April 1994, the RNSTS ceased to exist and was absorbed into the Naval Support Command. At first renamed the 'Warship Support Agency', it went on to form part of the tri-service Defence Logistics Organisation, which is now part of the Defence Equipment and Support (DE&S) conglomerate. The RNADs also lost their independence; those RNADs that are still in use today are known as Defence Munitions centres (DM, e.g. DM Beith), with the aforementioned exception of RNAD Coulport.

List of RNADs and their status

In Britain and Ireland

Overseas

See also
 Ordnance Board
 RAF munitions storage during WWII
 Royal Naval Supply and Transport Service

References

Notes

Sources
 W N Mansfield (1995), "Priddy's Hard 1846 – 1906 – The site impact of the introduction of modern chemical explosives" – BSc (Hons) Archaeology dissertation.
 Semark, H.W. (1997). The Royal Naval Armaments Depots of Priddy's Hard, Elson, Frater and Bedebham (Gosport, Hampshire) 1768 to 1977. Winchester: Hampshire County Council. .

External links

Royal Navy

Ammunition dumps of the United Kingdom